Norske Jenter (Norwegian Girls) is the debut album of the Norwegian rock-band The Kids.

Tracklist 
 "Norske jenter"
 "Nye klær"
 "Fanklubb"
 "Rock n Roll"
 "The Kids er ålreit"
 "Cool"
 "Forelska i lærern"
 "Null"
 "Gaterock" 
 "Superstar"
 "Ensom "
 "En liten pike"

Certifications

References

1980 debut albums
The Kids (Norwegian band) albums